Tornike Aptsiauri (born 29 November 1979 in Tbilisi) is a Georgian professional football player.

Career statistics

Achievements
Dinamo-2 Tbilisi
Pirveli Liga
Winner (1): 1998–99 Regionuli Liga (East, B zone)
Olimpi Rustavi
Umaglesi Liga
Winner (1): 2006–07
Zestafoni
Umaglesi Liga
Winner (2): 2010–11, 2011–12
Georgian Cup
Runner-Up (1): 2011–12
Georgian Super Cup
Winner (2): 2011, 2012

References

External links
 
 

1979 births
Living people
Footballers from Georgia (country)
Footballers from Tbilisi
Expatriate footballers from Georgia (country)
Expatriate footballers in Azerbaijan
Georgia (country) international footballers
FC Lokomotivi Tbilisi players
FC Tbilisi players
FC Merani Tbilisi players
FC Dinamo Tbilisi players
FC Borjomi players
FC Metalurgi Rustavi players
Gabala FC players
Expatriate sportspeople from Georgia (country) in Azerbaijan
FC Zestafoni players
FC Sioni Bolnisi players
Association football midfielders